Kyle David Smaine (June 27, 1991 – January 29, 2023) was an American freestyle skier. He won a gold medal in halfpipe at the FIS Freestyle Ski and Snowboarding World Championships 2015.

Smaine met Jenna Dramise in 2010 while hitchhiking in New Zealand. They married on November 18, 2022. 

Smaine died alongside an Austrian skier in an avalanche on Mount Norikura, located in the northern part of the Hida Mountains near Tsugaike Ski Resort in Otari, Nagano, Japan, on January 29, 2023, at the age of 31.

References

External links
 
 

1991 births
2023 deaths
American male freestyle skiers
Deaths in avalanches
Natural disaster deaths in Japan
21st-century American men
People from Apple Valley, California